Dolenje Gradišče may refer to the following places in Slovenia:

Dolenje Gradišče, Dolenjske Toplice, a village in the Municipality of Dolenjske Toplice
Dolenje Gradišče pri Šentjerneju, a village in the Municipality of pri Šentjernej

See also
Gradišče (disambiguation)
Gorenje Gradišče (disambiguation)